Coat of arms of Almaty is one of official symbols of city of Almaty in Kazakhstan. Adopted at July 6, 1993.

Description and symbolism
The official coat of arms's description:

Coat of arms' author is Shaken Onlasynonvich Niyazbekov.

References

Almaty
Coats of arms with leopards
Coats of arms with mountains
Municipal coats of arms in Kazakhstan